Cundinamarca State was one of the states of Colombia. It was created on 15 June 1857 as Estado Federal de Cundinamarca (Federal State of Cundinamarca), in 1858 was recognized as Estado de la Federación,  and in the constitution of 1863 renamed as Estado Soberano (Sovereign State of Cundinamarca) of the United States of Colombia.

Subdivisions 

With the law of 15 June 1857, the state was divided into 8 departments, but in 1858 most were abolished, leaving only Bogotá Department, Neiva Department, Mariquita Department, and San Martín Territory.

Later in 1861, Mariquita Department and Neiva Department were separated to form Tolima State.

Departments of 1862 
By the law of 25 August 1862 the state was divided into 7 departamentos:

 Bogotá Department
 Cáqueza Department
 Chocontá Department
 Guatavita Department
 Guaduas Department
 Tequendama Department
 Zipaquirá Department

Departments of 1874
For the year 1874 the number of departments remained the same, but some had been deleted and others created:

 Bogotá Department (capital Bogotá)
 Cáqueza Department (capital Fómeque)
 Facatativá Department (capital Facatativá)
 La Palma Department (capital La Palma)
 Tequendama Department (capital La Mesa)
 Ubaté Department (capital Ubaté)
 Zipaquirá Department (capital Zipaquirá)

San Martín Territory, capital in Villavicencio, was in Bogotá Department but under administration of the national government.

References 

States of Colombia
Sovereign States of the Granadine Confederation
1857 establishments in the Republic of New Granada
Geography of Cundinamarca Department
Geography of Meta Department
Geography of Vichada Department